The 2019 NHL Stadium Series (officially the 2019 Coors Light NHL Stadium Series) was a regular season National Hockey League (NHL) game played outdoors, as part of the Stadium Series of games held at football or baseball stadiums. The Philadelphia Flyers defeated the Pittsburgh Penguins 4–3 in overtime at Lincoln Financial Field in Philadelphia, Pennsylvania, on February 23, 2019.

This was the only game in the Stadium Series held during the 2018–19 season (as opposed to multiple games in 2014 and 2016).

Background

In 2016, the Pittsburgh Penguins and the Philadelphia Flyers worked out an agreement to play a home-and-home series of outdoors games. The first game that was planned eventually became the 2017 Stadium Series game at Heinz Field in Pittsburgh. The NHL does not usually schedule teams to appear in outdoors games in consecutive years, so Philadelphia did not host this rematch until 2019. The two archrivals had also discussed playing a neutral site game at Beaver Stadium at State College, Pennsylvania, but it never materialized, due mainly to concerns about Beaver Stadium's plumbing being unable to withstand an event in winter.

Game summary
The Flyers scored two goals with an extra attacker/goalie pulled late in the third period to tie the game at 3–3, then won it off of Claude Giroux's score at 1:59 into overtime. Jakub Voracek scored the tying goal with 20 seconds left in regulation, as well as recording two assists. Voracek's score came after James van Riemsdyk's power play goal with 3:04 left cut the Penguins' lead to 3–2.

Number in parentheses represents the player's total in goals or assists to that point of the season

Team rosters

 Casey DeSmith and Cam Talbot dressed as the back-up goaltenders. Neither entered the game.

Scratches
Pittsburgh Penguins: Dominik Simon, Juuso Riikola, Teddy Blueger
Philadelphia Flyers: Radko Gudas, Corban Knight, Carter Hart

Pregame/Anthem/Entertainment
Keith Urban performed during the first intermission, and the Glorious Sons performed during the second intermission.

Before puck-drop Philadelphia sports legends were introduced. For the Phillies Jimmy Rollins, for the Eagles Jason Kelce, for the 76ers Tobias Harris and Boban Marjanovic, and for the Flyers Bobby Clarke.

After the legends were honored the Flyers' mascot Gritty made a surprise entrance. Then the teams entered.

The national anthem was performed by the Flyers' anthem singer, Lauren Hart.

A ceremonial puck-drop was done by the Eagles' coach, Doug Pederson.

References

NHL Stadium Series
Stadium Series
2019 in ice hockey
2019 in Philadelphia
Pittsburgh Penguins games
Philadelphia Flyers games
NHL Stadium Series
NHL Stadium Series
Ice hockey competitions in Philadelphia